Tilia maximowicziana is a species of flowering plant in the lime and linden genus Tilia, family Malvaceae. It is native to central and northern Japan, and Kunashir Island, the southernmost of the Kuril Islands. In the mountain forests of Hokkaido and northern Honshu it is often a dominant canopy species. A handsome tree, little planted outside its native range, it is available from commercial suppliers.

References

maximowicziana
Flora of Japan
Flora of the Kuril Islands
Plants described in 1900